Qoydan (also, Koydan) is a village and the least populous municipality in the Ismailli Rayon of Azerbaijan.  It has a population of 70.

Weather 
The weather of Qoydan, and much of Azerbaijan in general deeply ranges from hot arid summers and to mild winters. During the Summer months it averages near and around 30°C(86°F), but averages 0°C(32°f) during the winter months.

References 

Populated places in Ismayilli District